Astrocaryum triandrum is a species of flowering plant in the family Arecaceae. It is found only in Colombia. It is threatened by habitat loss.

References

triandrum
Endemic flora of Colombia
Endangered plants
Taxonomy articles created by Polbot